Bertram Lasbrey was a long serving Anglican bishop in the 20th century.

He was born in 1881, educated at Bedford School and St Catharine's College, Cambridge and ordained in 1905. He held Curacies at St Andrew, Bishop Auckland and St John, Melcombe Regis. He was then Vicar of St Gabriel, Bishopwearmouth. In 1922 he became Bishop on the Niger, a post he held for 23 years. Returning to England he was an Assistant Bishop of Worcester. He died on 6 April 1976.

References

1881 births
People educated at Bedford School
Alumni of St Catharine's College, Cambridge
20th-century Anglican bishops in Nigeria
Anglican bishops on the Niger
1976 deaths